Paul Chart (born 10 October 1961) is an English film director, screenwriter and producer. His film American Perfekt was screened in the Un Certain Regard section at the 1997 Cannes Film Festival.

Filmography
 Not a War Film (1984)
 Hand in Hand (1985)
 Nothing Wrong (1987)
 Foreign Bodies (1987)
 Judgement in Berlin (1988) (writer - uncredited)
 A Conversation with Ken Kesey (1995)
 American Perfekt (1997)
 Breaking Waves (2011)

References

External links

1961 births
Living people
English film directors
English screenwriters
English male screenwriters
English film producers
Writers from London